Charilaos Bikas (born 8 July 1992) is a Greek professional footballer who plays as an attacking midfielder for Super League 2 club Thesprotos, for which he is captain.

Club career
Born in Greece, Bikas made his senior debut with Thesprotos. He played a competitive match for Thesprotos in the Gamma Ethniki Play-off round on May 5, 2019, against Niki Volou, during which he played as a defensive midfielder and was shown a yellow card in the 81st minute. He further played in the Greek Football Cup in the initial season in which he played 5 games and scored 4 goals for the club. He scored against Niki Volou in Gamma Ethniki and Asteras Itea and Anagennisi Plagias.

In the 2019–20 season he scored on two occasions in 19 games and played in the Greek Football Cup.

References

1992 births
Living people
Greek footballers
Association football midfielders
Thesprotos F.C. players
Football League (Greece) players
Gamma Ethniki players
People from Igoumenitsa